Qazma (also, Kazma and Kazmatabun ) is a village and municipality in the Balakan Rayon of Azerbaijan.  It has a population of 6,639.  The municipality consists of the villages of Qazma, Bedağar, Darvazbinə, Cillik, Öküzovtala, and Şambulbinə.

References 

Populated places in Balakan District